NGC 721 is a barred spiral galaxy located in the constellation Andromeda about 250 million light years from the Milky Way. It was discovered by the Prussian astronomer Heinrich d'Arrest in 1862.

See also 
 List of NGC objects (1–1000)

References 

Barred spiral galaxies
Andromeda (constellation)
0721
007097